Cistothorus is a genus of small passerine birds in the family Troglodytidae.

Taxonomy 
The genus Cistothorus was circumscribed by the German ornithologist Jean Cabanis in 1850. The type species is the sedge wren (Cistothorus stellaris).

Species 
The genus contains five species:

 Sedge wren, short-billed marsh wren, Cistothorus stellaris – northern Mexico, United States and southern Canada
 Mérida wren, Cistothorus meridae – Venezuelan Andes
 Apolinar's wren, Cistothorus apolinari – Colombian Andes
 Grass wren, Cistothorus platensis – central and South America
 Marsh wren, long-billed marsh wren, Cistothorus palustris – Mexico, United States and southern Canada

The sedge wren and the grass wren were formerly treated as conspecific. They were split based on the results of a molecular phylogenetic study published in 2014.

Notes

References 

 
Troglodytidae
Bird genera
Taxonomy articles created by Polbot